Clark Russell Wever (September 16, 1835 – February 20, 1874) was a Union Army officer during the American Civil War.

Before the war, he traveled through Mexico and Texas.  At the beginning of the war, this banker was elected a captain of the 17th Iowa Volunteer Infantry.  In October 1862, he was promoted to lieutenant-colonel.  He served in the Chattanooga campaign and Sherman's March to the Sea.

On February 9, 1865, President Abraham Lincoln nominated Walker for appointment to the grade of brevet brigadier general of volunteers, to rank from February 9, 1865, and the United States Senate confirmed the appointment on February 14, 1865.

See also
 Battle of Bentonville
List of American Civil War brevet generals (Union)

References

Union Army officers
United States Army officers
1835 births
1874 deaths